Below is the list of highway tunnels on Turkish motorways.

Motorway Tunnels

Motorway Tunnels (under construction)

Motorway Tunnels (projected)
Yalova-İzmit Motorway, Yalova-Elmalık, T1 Motorway Tunnel (projected) - 2 x 942 m
Yalova-İzmit Motorway, Yalova-Elmalık, T2 Motorway Tunnel (projected) - 2 x 1.045 m
Yalova-İzmit Motorway, Çukurköy-Gölcük, T1 Motorway Tunnel (projected) - 2 x 480 m
Yalova-İzmit Motorway, Çukurköy-Gölcük, T2 Motorway Tunnel (projected) - 2 x 880 m
Yalova-İzmit Motorway, Çukurköy-Gölcük, T3 Motorway Tunnel (projected) - 2 x 1.560 m
Yalova-İzmit Motorway, Çukurköy-Gölcük, T4 Motorway Tunnel (projected) - 2 x 3.730 m
Yalova-İzmit Motorway, Gölcük-Bahçecik, T5 Motorway Tunnel (projected) - 2 x 830 m
Yalova-İzmit Motorway, Bahçecik-Karatepe, T6 Motorway Tunnel (projected) - 2 x 3.155 m
Kınalı-Balıkesir Motorway, Çorlu Cut-Cover T1 Motorway Tunnel (projected) - 2 x 500 m
Kınalı-Balıkesir Motorway, Tekirdağ-Malkara, T2 Cut-Cover Motorway Tunnel (projected) - 2 x 500 m
Kınalı-Balıkesir Motorway, Tekirdağ-Malkara, T1 Motorway Tunnel (projected) - 2 x 1.038 m
Kınalı-Balıkesir Motorway, Lapseki-Çan, T2 Motorway Tunnel (projected) - 2 x 895 m
Kınalı-Balıkesir Motorway, Lapseki-Çan, T3 Motorway Tunnel (projected) - 2 x 1.830 m
Kınalı-Balıkesir Motorway, Çan-Yenice, T4 Motorway Tunnel (projected) - 2 x 990 m
Kınalı-Balıkesir Motorway, Yenice-Balya, T5 Motorway Tunnel (projected) - 2 x 2.045 m
Ankara-Samsun Motorway, Elmadağ-Yahşihan, T1 Motorway Tunnel (projected) - 2 x 1.280 m
Ankara-Samsun Motorway, Elmadağ-Yahşihan, T2 Motorway Tunnel (projected) - 2 x 1.255 m
Ankara-Samsun Motorway, Elmadağ-Yahşihan, T3 Motorway Tunnel (projected) - 2 x 475 m
Ankara-Samsun Motorway, Elmadağ-Yahşihan, T4 Motorway Tunnel (projected) - 2 x 878 m
Ankara-Samsun Motorway, Merzifon-Havza, T5 Motorway Tunnel (projected) - 2 x 6.600 m
Ankara-Samsun Motorway, Merzifon-Havza, T6 Motorway Tunnel (projected) - 2 x 855 m
Ankara-Samsun Motorway, Havza-Samsun, T7 Motorway Tunnel (projected) - 2 x 2.965 m
Ankara-Samsun Motorway, Havza-Samsun, T8 Motorway Tunnel (projected) - 2 x 565 m
Ankara-Samsun Motorway, Havza-Samsun, T9 Motorway Tunnel (projected) - 2 x 1.935 m
Bafra-Samsun-Ünye Motorway, Bafra-Samsun, T1 Motorway Tunnel (projected) – 2 x 1,240 m
Bafra-Samsun-Ünye Motorway, Bafra-Samsun, T2 Motorway Tunnel (projected) – 2 x 3,540 m
Bafra-Samsun-Ünye Motorway, Bafra-Samsun, T3 Motorway Tunnel (projected) – 2 x 480 m
Bafra-Samsun-Ünye Motorway, Bafra-Samsun, T4 Motorway Tunnel (projected) – 2 x 1,600 m
Bafra-Samsun-Ünye Motorway, Bafra-Samsun, T5 Motorway Tunnel (projected) – 2 x 1,300 m
Bafra-Samsun-Ünye Motorway, Bafra-Samsun, T6 Motorway Tunnel (projected) – 2 x 1,000 m
Bafra-Samsun-Ünye Motorway, Bafra-Samsun, T7 Motorway Tunnel (projected) – 2 x 1,000 m
Bafra-Samsun-Ünye Motorway, Bafra-Samsun, T8 Motorway Tunnel (projected) – 2 x 1,320 m
Bafra-Samsun-Ünye Motorway, Bafra-Samsun, T9 Motorway Tunnel (projected) – 2 x 2,360 m
Bafra-Samsun-Ünye Motorway, Samsun-Ünye, T10 Motorway Tunnel (projected) – 2 x 440 m
Bafra-Samsun-Ünye Motorway, Samsun-Ünye, T11 Motorway Tunnel (projected) – 2 x 2,360 m
Bafra-Samsun-Ünye Motorway, Samsun-Ünye, T12 Motorway Tunnel (projected) – 2 x 4,400 m
Bafra-Samsun-Ünye Motorway, Samsun-Ünye, T13 Motorway Tunnel (projected) – 2 x 5,540 m
Bafra-Samsun-Ünye Motorway, Samsun-Ünye, T14 Motorway Tunnel (projected) – 2 x 440 m
Bafra-Samsun-Ünye Motorway, Samsun-Ünye, T15 Motorway Tunnel (projected) – 2 x 380 m
Bafra-Samsun-Ünye Motorway, Samsun-Ünye, T16 Motorway Tunnel (projected) – 2 x 1,320 m
Afyon-Antalya Motorway, BurdurNorth-BurdurSouth, T1 (Burdur) Motorway Tunnel (projected) - 2 x 1.615 m
Afyon-Antalya Motorway, BurdurNorth-BurdurSouth, T2 (MAKÜ) Motorway Tunnel (projected) - 2 x 1.585 m
Afyon-Antalya Motorway, Burdur-Bucak, T3 Motorway Tunnel (projected) - 2 x 2.000 m
Afyon-Antalya Motorway, Burdur-Bucak, T4 Motorway Tunnel (projected) - 2 x 865 m
Afyon-Antalya Motorway, Burdur-Bucak, T5 Motorway Tunnel (projected) - 2 x 580 m
Afyon-Antalya Motorway, Burdur-Bucak, T6 Motorway Tunnel (projected) - 2 x 1.145 m
Afyon-Antalya Motorway, Burdur-Bucak, T7 Motorway Tunnel (projected) - 2 x 1.930 m
Afyon-Antalya Motorway, Bucak-Antalya, T8 Motorway Tunnel (projected) - 2 x 1.185 m
Afyon-Antalya Motorway, Bucak-Antalya, T9 Motorway Tunnel (projected) - 2 x 310 m
Afyon-Antalya Motorway, Bucak-Antalya, T10 Motorway Tunnel (projected) - 2 x 1.855 m
Afyon-Antalya Motorway, Bucak-Antalya, T11 Motorway Tunnel (projected) - 2 x 400 m
Antalya-Alanya Motorway, Antalya-Taşağıl, T1 Motorway Tunnel (projected) - 2 x 1.070 m
Antalya-Alanya Motorway, Antalya-Taşağıl, T2 Motorway Tunnel (projected) - 2 x 1.680 m
Antalya-Alanya Motorway, Antalya-Taşağıl, T3 Motorway Tunnel (projected) - 2 x 1.080 m
Antalya-Alanya Motorway, Antalya-Taşağıl, T4 Motorway Tunnel (projected) - 2 x 2.220 m
Antalya-Alanya Motorway, Taşağıl-Manavgat, T5 Motorway Tunnel (projected) - 2 x 560 m
Antalya-Alanya Motorway, Manavgat T6 Motorway Tunnel (projected) - 2 x 875 m
Antalya-Alanya Motorway, Manavgat-Alarahan, T7 Motorway Tunnel (projected) - 2 x 805 m
Antalya-Alanya Motorway, Alarahan-Konaklı, T8 Motorway Tunnel (projected) - 2 x 2.965 m
Antalya-Alanya Motorway, Konaklı-Alanya, T9 Motorway Tunnel (projected) - 2 x 6.715 m
Antalya-Alanya Motorway, Konaklı-Alanya, T10 Motorway Tunnel (projected) - 2 x 4.440 m
Denizli-Burdur Motorway, Honaz-Çardak, T1 Motorway Tunnel (projected) - 2 x 770 m
Denizli-Burdur Motorway, Çardak-Burdur, T2 Motorway Tunnel (projected) - 2 x 4.385 m
Denizli-Burdur Motorway, Çardak-Burdur, T3 Motorway Tunnel (projected) - 2 x 3.115 m
Denizli-Burdur Motorway, Burdur-Bucak, T4 Motorway Tunnel (projected) - 2 x 2.220 m
Gerede-Gürbulak Motorway, Gerede-Merzifon Section, Gerede-Eskipazar, T1 Motorway Tunnel (projected) - 2 x 3.130 m
Gerede-Gürbulak Motorway, Gerede-Merzifon Section, Gerede-Eskipazar, T2 Motorway Tunnel (projected) - 2 x 260 m
Gerede-Gürbulak Motorway, Gerede-Merzifon Section, Eskipazar-Çerkeş, T3 Motorway Tunnel (projected) - 2 x 4.080 m
Gerede-Gürbulak Motorway, Gerede-Merzifon Section, Eskipazar-Çerkeş, T4 Motorway Tunnel (projected) - 2 x 345 m
Gerede-Gürbulak Motorway, Gerede-Merzifon Section, Kurşunlu-Ilgaz, T5 Motorway Tunnel (projected) - 2 x 1.570 m
Gerede-Gürbulak Motorway, Gerede-Merzifon Section, Ilgaz-Tosya, T6 Motorway Tunnel (projected) - 2 x 140 m
Gerede-Gürbulak Motorway, Gerede-Merzifon Section, Ilgaz-Tosya, T7 Motorway Tunnel (projected) - 2 x 515 m
Gerede-Gürbulak Motorway, Gerede-Merzifon Section, Ilgaz-Tosya, T8 Motorway Tunnel (projected) - 2 x 1.205 m
Gerede-Gürbulak Motorway, Gerede-Merzifon Section, Ilgaz-Tosya, T9 Motorway Tunnel (projected) - 2 x 625 m
Gerede-Gürbulak Motorway, Gerede-Merzifon Section, Ilgaz-Tosya, T10 Motorway Tunnel (projected) - 2 x 370 m
Gerede-Gürbulak Motorway, Gerede-Merzifon Section, Kargı-Osmancık, T11 Motorway Tunnel (projected) - 2 x 1.000 m
Gerede-Gürbulak Motorway, Gerede-Merzifon Section, Kargı-Osmancık, T12 Motorway Tunnel (projected) - 2 x 940 m
Gerede-Gürbulak Motorway, Gerede-Merzifon Section, Kargı-Osmancık, T13 Motorway Tunnel (projected) - 2 x 650 m
Gerede-Gürbulak Motorway, Gerede-Merzifon Section, Kargı-Osmancık, T14 Motorway Tunnel (projected) - 2 x 325 m
Gerede-Gürbulak Motorway, Gerede-Merzifon Section, Kargı-Osmancık, T15 Motorway Tunnel (projected) - 2 x 915 m
Gerede-Gürbulak Motorway, Gerede-Merzifon Section, Kargı-Osmancık, T16 Motorway Tunnel (projected) - 2 x 5.450 m
Gerede-Gürbulak Motorway, Gerede-Merzifon Section, Kargı-Osmancık, T17 Motorway Tunnel (projected) - 2 x 2.805 m
Gerede-Gürbulak Motorway, Gerede-Merzifon Section, Kargı-Osmancık, T18 Motorway Tunnel (projected) - 2 x 465 m
Gerede-Gürbulak Motorway, Gerede-Merzifon Section, Kargı-Osmancık, T19 Motorway Tunnel (projected) - 2 x 870 m
Gerede-Gürbulak Motorway, Gerede-Merzifon Section, Kargı-Osmancık, T20 Motorway Tunnel (projected) - 2 x 855 m
Gerede-Gürbulak Motorway, Gerede-Merzifon Section, Kargı-Osmancık, T21 Motorway Tunnel (projected) - 2 x 3.795 m
Gerede-Gürbulak Motorway, Gerede-Merzifon Section, Kargı-Osmancık, T22 Motorway Tunnel (projected) - 2 x 2.515 m
Gerede-Gürbulak Motorway, Gerede-Merzifon Section, Kargı-Osmancık, T23 Motorway Tunnel (projected) - 2 x 4.035 m
Gerede-Gürbulak Motorway, Merzifon-Koyulhisar Section, Amasya T1 Motorway Tunnel (projected) - 2 x 472 m
Gerede-Gürbulak Motorway, Merzifon-Koyulhisar Section, Amasya T2 Motorway Tunnel (projected) - 2 x 3.091 m
Gerede-Gürbulak Motorway, Merzifon-Koyulhisar Section, Amasya T3 Motorway Tunnel (projected) - 2 x 730 m
Gerede-Gürbulak Motorway, Merzifon-Koyulhisar Section, Amasya T4 Motorway Tunnel (projected) - 2 x 304 m
Gerede-Gürbulak Motorway, Merzifon-Koyulhisar Section, Amasya T5 Motorway Tunnel (projected) - 2 x 1.281 m
Gerede-Gürbulak Motorway, Merzifon-Koyulhisar Section, Turhal T6 Motorway Tunnel (projected) - 2 x 1.221 m
Gerede-Gürbulak Motorway, Merzifon-Koyulhisar Section, Turhal T7 Motorway Tunnel (projected) - 2 x 1.202 m
Gerede-Gürbulak Motorway, Merzifon-Koyulhisar Section, Turhal T8 Motorway Tunnel (projected) - 2 x 2.500 m
Gerede-Gürbulak Motorway, Merzifon-Koyulhisar Section, Turhal T9 Motorway Tunnel (projected) - 2 x 368 m
Gerede-Gürbulak Motorway, Merzifon-Koyulhisar Section, Turhal T10 Motorway Tunnel (projected) - 2 x 2.113 m
Gerede-Gürbulak Motorway, Merzifon-Koyulhisar Section, Turhal T11 Motorway Tunnel (projected) - 2 x 3.710 m
Gerede-Gürbulak Motorway, Merzifon-Koyulhisar Section, Tokat T12 Motorway Tunnel (projected) - 2 x 3.217 m
Gerede-Gürbulak Motorway, Merzifon-Koyulhisar Section, Tokat T13 Motorway Tunnel (projected) - 2 x 1.036 m
Gerede-Gürbulak Motorway, Merzifon-Koyulhisar Section, Tokat T14 Motorway Tunnel (projected) - 2 x 5.525 m
Gerede-Gürbulak Motorway, Merzifon-Koyulhisar Section, Almus T15 Motorway Tunnel (projected) - 2 x 3.160 m
Gerede-Gürbulak Motorway, Merzifon-Koyulhisar Section, Almus T16 Motorway Tunnel (projected) - 2 x 2.119 m
Gerede-Gürbulak Motorway, Merzifon-Koyulhisar Section, Almus T17 Motorway Tunnel (projected) - 2 x 2.697 m
Gerede-Gürbulak Motorway, Merzifon-Koyulhisar Section, Almus T18 Motorway Tunnel (projected) - 2 x 4.048 m
Gerede-Gürbulak Motorway, Merzifon-Koyulhisar Section, Reşadiye T19 Motorway Tunnel (projected) - 2 x 799 m
Gerede-Gürbulak Motorway, Merzifon-Koyulhisar Section, Reşadiye T20 Motorway Tunnel (projected) - 2 x 473 m
Gerede-Gürbulak Motorway, Merzifon-Koyulhisar Section, Reşadiye T21 Motorway Tunnel (projected) - 2 x 363 m
Gerede-Gürbulak Motorway, Merzifon-Koyulhisar Section, Reşadiye T22 Motorway Tunnel (projected) - 2 x 762 m
Gerede-Gürbulak Motorway, Merzifon-Koyulhisar Section, Reşadiye T23 Motorway Tunnel (projected) - 2 x 323 m
Gerede-Gürbulak Motorway, Merzifon-Koyulhisar Section, Reşadiye T24 Motorway Tunnel (projected) - 2 x 344 m
Gerede-Gürbulak Motorway, Merzifon-Koyulhisar Section, Doğanşar T25 Motorway Tunnel (projected) - 2 x 7.788 m
Gerede-Gürbulak Motorway, Merzifon-Koyulhisar Section, Koyulhisar T26 Motorway Tunnel (projected) - 2 x 1.520 m
Gerede-Gürbulak Motorway, Merzifon-Koyulhisar Section, Koyulhisar T27 Motorway Tunnel (projected) - 2 x 849 m
Gerede-Gürbulak Motorway, Merzifon-Koyulhisar Section, Koyulhisar T28 Motorway Tunnel (projected) - 2 x 706 m
Gerede-Gürbulak Motorway, Merzifon-Koyulhisar Section, Koyulhisar T29 Motorway Tunnel (projected) - 2 x 849 m
Gerede-Gürbulak Motorway, Merzifon-Koyulhisar Section, Koyulhisar T30 Motorway Tunnel (projected) - 2 x 1.583 m
Gerede-Gürbulak Motorway, Koyulhisar-Pülümür Section, Koyulhisar-Suşehri, T1 Motorway Tunnel (projected) - 2 x 2.750 m
Gerede-Gürbulak Motorway, Koyulhisar-Pülümür Section, Koyulhisar-Suşehri, T2 Motorway Tunnel (projected) - 2 x 4.550 m
Gerede-Gürbulak Motorway, Koyulhisar-Pülümür Section, Koyulhisar-Suşehri, T3 Motorway Tunnel (projected) - 2 x 8.000 m
Gerede-Gürbulak Motorway, Koyulhisar-Pülümür Section, Gölova-Sivas, T4 Motorway Tunnel (projected) - 2 x 1.600 m
Gerede-Gürbulak Motorway, Koyulhisar-Pülümür Section, Gölova-Sivas, T5 Motorway Tunnel (projected) - 2 x 4.300 m
Gerede-Gürbulak Motorway, Koyulhisar-Pülümür Section, Sivas-Refahiye, T6 Motorway Tunnel (projected) - 2 x 4.900 m
Gerede-Gürbulak Motorway, Koyulhisar-Pülümür Section, Refahiye-Kemah, T7 Motorway Tunnel (projected) - 2 x 2.100 m
Gerede-Gürbulak Motorway, Koyulhisar-Pülümür Section, Refahiye-Kemah, T8 Motorway Tunnel (projected) - 2 x 2.350 m
Gerede-Gürbulak Motorway, Koyulhisar-Pülümür Section, Refahiye-Kemah, T9 Motorway Tunnel (projected) - 2 x 3.100 m
Gerede-Gürbulak Motorway, Koyulhisar-Pülümür Section, Refahiye-Kemah, T10 Motorway Tunnel (projected) - 2 x 4.250 m
Gerede-Gürbulak Motorway, Koyulhisar-Pülümür Section, Refahiye-Kemah, T11 Motorway Tunnel (projected) - 2 x 450 m
Gerede-Gürbulak Motorway, Koyulhisar-Pülümür Section, Refahiye-Kemah, T12 Motorway Tunnel (projected) - 2 x 4.200 m
Gerede-Gürbulak Motorway, Koyulhisar-Pülümür Section, Refahiye-Kemah, T13 Motorway Tunnel (projected) - 2 x 6.350 m
Gerede-Gürbulak Motorway, Koyulhisar-Pülümür Section, Kemah-Erzincan, T14 Motorway Tunnel (projected) - 2 x 1.000 m
Gerede-Gürbulak Motorway, Koyulhisar-Pülümür Section, Kemah-Erzincan, T15 Motorway Tunnel (projected) - 2 x 250 m
Gerede-Gürbulak Motorway, Koyulhisar-Pülümür Section, Kemah-Erzincan, T16 Motorway Tunnel (projected) - 2 x 800 m
Gerede-Gürbulak Motorway, Koyulhisar-Pülümür Section, Kemah-Erzincan, T17 Motorway Tunnel (projected) - 2 x 750 m
Gerede-Gürbulak Motorway, Koyulhisar-Pülümür Section, Kemah-Erzincan, T18 Motorway Tunnel (projected) - 2 x 400 m
Gerede-Gürbulak Motorway, Koyulhisar-Pülümür Section, Kemah-Erzincan, T19 Motorway Tunnel (projected) - 2 x 600 m
Gerede-Gürbulak Motorway, Koyulhisar-Pülümür Section, Kemah-Erzincan, T20 Motorway Tunnel (projected) - 2 x 200 m
Gerede-Gürbulak Motorway, Koyulhisar-Pülümür Section, Kemah-Erzincan, T21 Motorway Tunnel (projected) - 2 x 500 m
Gerede-Gürbulak Motorway, Koyulhisar-Pülümür Section, Kemah-Erzincan, T22 Motorway Tunnel (projected) - 2 x 5.710 m
Gerede-Gürbulak Motorway, Koyulhisar-Pülümür Section, Erzincan-Pülümür, T23 Motorway Tunnel (projected) - 2 x 7.960 m
Gerede-Gürbulak Motorway, Koyulhisar-Pülümür Section, Erzincan-Pülümür, T24 Motorway Tunnel (projected) - 2 x 5.600 m
Gerede-Gürbulak Motorway, Koyulhisar-Pülümür Section, Erzincan-Pülümür, T25 Motorway Tunnel (projected) - 2 x 3.020 m
Gerede-Gürbulak Motorway, Pülümür-Horasan Section, Pülümür-Kargın, T1 Motorway Tunnel (projected) - 2 x 4.500 m
Gerede-Gürbulak Motorway, Pülümür-Horasan Section, Tercan-Aşkale, T2 Motorway Tunnel (projected) - 2 x 4.000 m
Gerede-Gürbulak Motorway, Pülümür-Horasan Section, Tercan-Aşkale, T3 Motorway Tunnel (projected) - 2 x 1.750 m
Gerede-Gürbulak Motorway, Pülümür-Horasan Section, Tercan-Aşkale, T4 Motorway Tunnel (projected) - 2 x 4.400 m
Gerede-Gürbulak Motorway, Pülümür-Horasan Section, Tercan-Aşkale, T5 Motorway Tunnel (projected) - 2 x 2.600 m
Gerede-Gürbulak Motorway, Pülümür-Horasan Section, Tercan-Aşkale, T6 Motorway Tunnel (projected) - 2 x 1.500 m
Gerede-Gürbulak Motorway, Pülümür-Horasan Section, Tercan-Aşkale, T7 Motorway Tunnel (projected) - 2 x 1.450 m
Gerede-Gürbulak Motorway, Pülümür-Horasan Section, Tercan-Aşkale, T8 Motorway Tunnel (projected) - 2 x 5.350 m
Gerede-Gürbulak Motorway, Pülümür-Horasan Section, Erzurum-Pasinler, T9 Motorway Tunnel (projected) - 2 x 5.700 m
Gerede-Gürbulak Motorway, Horasan-Gürbulak Section, Horasan-Eleşkirt, T1 Motorway Tunnel (projected) - 2 x 1.600 m
Ankara-İzmir Motorway, Sivrihisar T1 Motorway Tunnel (projected) - 2 x 2.929 m
Ankara-İzmir Motorway, Çifteler-Seyitgazi, T2 (Börüklü) Motorway Tunnel (projected) - 2 x 1.255
Ankara-İzmir Motorway, Seyitgazi-Altıntaş, T3 Motorway Tunnel (projected) - 2 x 1.061 m
Ankara-İzmir Motorway, Seyitgazi-Altıntaş, T4 Motorway Tunnel (projected) - 2 x 2.688 m
Ankara-İzmir Motorway, Dumlupınar-Banaz, T5 Motorway Tunnel (projected) - 2 x 3.757 m
Ankara-İzmir Motorway, Uşak-Kula, T6 Motorway Tunnel (projected) - 2 x 2.700 m
Ankara-İzmir Motorway, Uşak-Kula, T7 Motorway Tunnel (projected) - 2 x 1.728 m
Ankara-İzmir Motorway, Kula T8 Motorway Tunnel (projected) - 2 x 2.823 m
Ankara-İzmir Motorway, Kula-Adala(Salihli), T9 Motorway Tunnel (projected) - 2 x 4.637 m
Ankara-İzmir Motorway, Adala(Salihli)-Gölmarmara, T10 Motorway Tunnel (projected) - 2 x 3.069 m
Ankara-İzmir Motorway, Gölmarmara-Ahmetli, T11 Motorway Tunnel (projected) - 2 x 2.770 m
Ankara-İzmir Motorway, Ahmetli-Turgutlu, T12 Motorway Tunnel (projected) - 2 x 857 m
İzmir 2. Ring Road, T1 Motorway Tunnel (projected) - 2 x 1.880 m
İzmir 2. Ring Road, T2 Motorway Tunnel (projected) - 2 x 1.200 m
İzmir 2. Ring Road, T3 Motorway Tunnel (projected) - 2 x 6.420 m
İzmir 2. Ring Road, T4 Motorway Tunnel (projected) - 2 x 1.800 m
İzmir 2. Ring Road, T5 Motorway Tunnel (projected) - 2 x 4.675 m
İzmir 2. Ring Road, T6 Motorway Tunnel (projected) - 2 x 2.150 m
İzmir 2. Ring Road, T7 Motorway Tunnel (projected) - 2 x 1.400 m
İzmir 2. Ring Road, T8 Motorway Tunnel (projected) - 2 x 3.900 m
İzmir 2. Ring Road, T9 Motorway Tunnel (projected) - 2 x 1.100 m
İzmir Ring Road - İZKARAY Subsea Road-Rail Tunnel (projected) - 3 x 1.797 m
İskenderun-Antakya Motorway, Belen T1 Motorway Tunnel (projected) – 2 x 800 m
İskenderun-Antakya Motorway, Belen T2 Motorway Tunnel (projected) – 2 x 8,050 m
Sivrihisar-Bursa Motorway, Bozüyük-Pekmezli, T1 Cut-Cover Motorway Tunnel (projected) - 2 x 670 m
Sivrihisar-Bursa Motorway, Bozüyük-Pekmezli, T2 Motorway Tunnel (projected) - 2 x 3.560 m
Çeşmeli-Taşucu Motorway, Silifke Motorway Tunnel (projected) - 2 x 1.570 m
Şanlıurfa-Habur Motorway, T1 Motorway Tunnel (projected) - 2 x 1.487 m
Şanlıurfa-Habur Motorway, T2 Cut-Cover Motorway Tunnel (projected) - 2 x 890 m

Notes

References

Highways in Turkey
Road tunnels in Turkey
Tunnels, motorway
Turkey
Turkey transport-related lists